F200DB-045 is a candidate high-redshift galaxy, with an estimated redshift of approximately z = 20.4, corresponding to 168 million years after the Big Bang. If confirmed, it would be one of the earliest and most distant known galaxies observed.

F200DB-045 would have a light-travel distance (lookback time) of 13.7 billion years, and, due to the expansion of the universe, a present proper distance of 36.1 billion light-years.

Nonetheless, the redshift value of the galaxy presented by the procedure in one study may differ from the values presented in other studies using different procedures.

Discovery
The candidate high-redshift galaxy F200DB-045  was discovered within the data from the Early Release Observations (ERO) that was obtained using the Near Infrared Camera of the James Webb Space Telescope (JWST) in July 2022. This data included a nearby galaxy cluster SMACS 0723-73, a massive cluster known as a possible "cosmic telescope" in amplifying background galaxies, including the F200DB-045 background galaxy.

Distance
Only a photometric redshift has been determined for F200DB-045; follow-up spectroscopic measurements will be required to confirm the redshift (see spectroscopic redshift). Spectroscopy could also determine the chemical composition, size and temperature of the galaxy.

If confirmed, then the galaxy may have existed in the early universe which may indicate that it may have been composed primarily of dust as well as stars, most likely population III stars, which may have been very young and massive. Also, as well, the galaxy may have been in the star formation phase.

See also

 CEERS-93316
 Earliest galaxies

 GLASS-z12
 HD1 (galaxy)
 JADES-GS-z13-0
 List of the most distant astronomical objects
 Peekaboo Galaxy

References

Astronomical objects discovered in 2022
Galaxies